Betty Shamieh is an American playwright, author, screenwriter, and actor of Palestinian descent.  She has written 15 plays.

Background

Shamieh was born in San Francisco, California.  She holds degrees from Harvard University and the Yale School of Drama.

Career

In 2012, Shamieh has authored 15 plays.

In 2004, she was a Clifton Visiting Artist at Harvard University and was selected as Playwriting fellow at Harvard University's Radcliffe Institute for Advanced Studies in 2005.

She has been awarded a Sundance Theatre Institute residency, New York Foundation for the Arts fellowship, New Dramatists Van Lier fellowship, Ford Foundation grant, Yaddo residency, Arts International grant, and Rockefeller Foundation residency in Bellagio, Italy.  She was awarded a playwriting grant from the National Endowment for the Arts and Theatre Communications Group to spend 2008 as a playwright-in-residence at the Magic Theatre.

Currently, Shamieh is a professor at Marymount Manhattan College in New York City.  She also serves on the Screenwriting/Playwriting Advisory Board for the New York Foundation for the Arts and is working on a commission from Time Warner/Second Stage Theatre plus a first novel.

Acting

Chocolate in Heat
Shamieh performed in her play of monologues entitled Chocolate in Heat - Growing up Arab in America at its sold-out premiere at the New York International Fringe Festival in August 2001.  The play has run twice off-off-Broadway and at more than 20 university theatres and venues.

Productions

Roar
Shamieh  became the first Palestinian-American to have a play premiereoff-Broadway with the 2004 premiere of Roar, a drama about a Palestinian family.  Tony-nominated Marion McClinton directed, and Annabella Sciorra and Sarita Choudhury starred. The play was the New York Times Critics Pick for four consecutive weeks.  Roar is currently being taught in multicultural theatre courses at universities throughout the United States.

The Black Eyed
Shamieh's play The Black Eyed had its off-Broadway premiere at New York Theatre Workshop.  The Theatre Fournos of Athens, Greece, has produced it in Greek translation.

Again and Against
Shamieh's play Again and Against was read during the New Work Now festival at the Public Theater in November 2006 and at the Royal Court Theatre in January 2007.

The Machine
Shamieh's one-act play The Machine was produced by Naked Angels and directed by Marisa Tomei in 2007.

Territories

Shamieh's play Territories had its European premiere at the European Union Capital of Culture Festival and its world premiere at the Magic Theatre.

Anonymous
Shamieh received Honorable Mention for her screenplay Anonymous from the Third Annual Writers Network competition.

Free Radicals
Shamieh's play Free Radicals was commissioned by Het Zuidelijk Toneel in the Netherlands.

Selected works
 2001:  Chocolate in Heat: Growing Up Arab in America (New York International Fringe Festival)
 2004:  Roar (off-Broadway at the New Group)
 2005:  The Black Eyed (New York Theatre Workshop, New York. Magic Theater, San Francisco. Theatre Fournos, Athens)
 2006:  Again and Against read at New Work Now festival and Royal Court Theatre
 2008:  Territories (European Union Capital of Culture Festival (Austria), Magic Theatre (San Francisco))

Publication

The Black Eyed & Architecture
Roar

both by Broadway Play Publishing Inc.

References
 BettyShamieh.com
 Institute for Middle East Understanding:  Betty Shamieh
 Radcliffe Institute for Advanced Study:  Betty Shamieh
 New York Theatre Workshop:  Betty Shamieh
 Magic Theatre
 Time Out New York Betty Shamieh explodes Arab archetypes in The Black Eyed

Yale School of Drama alumni
Living people
American people of Palestinian descent
Year of birth missing (living people)
Harvard University alumni
People from the San Francisco Bay Area